Miodrag Perunović (born 10 December 1957 in Cetinje) is a former professional boxer from Montenegro. He is also the author of several poetic writings and an autobiography.

References

External links
 Miodrag Perunovic at the 1980 Olympics (Moskva)

1957 births
Sportspeople from Cetinje
Living people
Olympic boxers of Yugoslavia
Welterweight boxers
Boxers at the 1980 Summer Olympics
Yugoslav male boxers
AIBA World Boxing Championships medalists
Montenegrin male boxers
Mediterranean Games gold medalists for Yugoslavia
Competitors at the 1979 Mediterranean Games
Mediterranean Games medalists in boxing